Jefferson Drum, also known as The Pen and the Quill, is an American Western television series starring Jeff Richards that aired on the NBC network from April 25 to December 11, 1958.

Overview
Jefferson Drum, portrayed by Jeff Richards, is a crusading newspaper editor in the Old West town of Jubilee. A widower, he rears his son, Joey, played by 10-year-old Eugene Mazzola, also known as Eugene Martin. Drum's printer is Lucius Coin, played by Cyril Delevanti. Big Ed, the town bartender, is portrayed by Robert J. Stevenson, later a member of the Los Angeles City Council. Hal J. Smith, later known for his role of the town drunk, Otis Campbell, on CBS's The Andy Griffith Show, was cast five times on Jefferson Drum as Hickey.

In the episode entitled "Pete Henke" (November 20, 1958), the character Henke, portrayed by Strother Martin, is a violent sharpshooter known for causing trouble. Editor Jefferson Drum challenges Henke to a fistfight in the saloon, but Henke prevails in the third round when he throws something into Drum's eyes and blinds him temporarily. The saloon hostess who gave Henke the blinding substance is later seen at Henke's "medicine show." In the end, the persistent Drum knocks over Henke with a punch. "Pete Henke" also starred Frank Wolff as Sam Creighton and Bert Remsen as Jim Ford.

The series first aired at 7:30 Eastern on Friday opposite repeats of I Love Lucy on CBS and Leave It to Beaver on ABC. For its second round of episodes it moved to Thursdays in the same 7:30 p.m. time slot. Rebroadcasts were aired during the first half of 1959. Jefferson Drum was produced for Screen Gems by Mark Goodson-Bill Todman Productions (known more for their game show output), and ran for parts of two seasons before it was cancelled.

Cast
 Jeff Richards .... Jefferson Drum
 Eugene Mazzola (billed as Eugene Martin) .... Joey Drum
 Cyril Delevanti .... Lucius Coin
 Robert J. Stevenson .... Big Ed

Guest stars

R.G. Armstrong, as Kreiger in "Law and Order"; Jerry Hopper also appears in this episode.
John Ashley, as Tim Keough in "Arrival", the series premiere
Jim Bannon, Jean Byron, and Russell Johnson, as Tay Beloin, Angela, and The Sundown Kid, respectively, in "A Very Deadly Game"
Gregg Barton, Virginia Gregg, and Harry Lauter appeared as Yance Meeker, Louise Hammond, and Vince Meeker, respectively, in "The Hanging of Joe Lavett".
Dan Blocker, Lane Bradford, and Dan Sheridan appeared as Craig, Hank, and Leo in the segment entitled "Stagecoach Episode."
Robert Bray and Charles Tannen, as Jack Page and Dandy Case, respectively, in the episode "Obituary"
Andy Clyde played Hepburn in the episode "The Keeney Gang"; L.Q. Jones appeared in the same segment as Burdette. 
Mike Connors, as the title guest star in "Simon Pitt", the series finale. Ted de Corsia and Patrice Wymore appear in this episode as Jim Kind and Goldie, respectively. 
Abby Dalton, Ron Hagerthy, and Douglas Kennedy appeared as Eloise Barton, Will Barton, and Dallas, respectively, in the episode "Thicker than Water". 
Francis De Sales and Kenneth Tobey appeared as Bass Williard and John Wallach, respectively, in "$50 for a Dead Man."
Andrew Duggan, Paul Sorensen, Rex Lease, and Philip Ahn appear as Charles McGowan, Benson, Tobin, and Charles Wong, respectively, in "The Cheater". 
Douglas Fowley, as Wooley in "Wheel of Fortune", with Richard Webb as Duane, and Jeanne Cooper as Phoebe West
Bruce Gordon, as Juan Cavanaugh in "A Sad Day for a Tinhorn"
James Griffith, Robert Vaughn, and Anna Karen as Troy Bendick, Shelly Poe, and Bess, respectively" in the episode "Return."
Skip Homeier, as Kading in "The Post"
Douglas Kennedy appeared as Dallas in "Thicker Than Water".
John Larch, as John Larkin in "The Bounty Man"
Gardner McKay, Paul Richards, Dennis Cross, and Irene Tedrow appeared as Simon Easton, Les Groves, Gideon Easton, and Mary Easton, respectively, in "Showdown".
Anna Karen Morrow appeared as Bess in the episode "Return".
Gregg Palmer and Rand Brooks appeared as Grant and as Ray Comstock, respectively, in "Band of Iron".
Judson Pratt, Denver Pyle, and Charles Fredericks appeared as Father Andrew Damon, Bart Resdake, and Warden Johns, respectively, in "Prison Hill".
William Schallert, as Polk Beauregard in "A Matter of Murder"
Karen Steele, in the titular role of "Madame Faro", with Rick Vallin cast as Tanner
Barbara Stuart appeared twice as Ellie in 1958 episodes "The Bounty Man" and "The Outlaw".
Karl Swenson, as Kiley in "The Lawless"

Episodes

Season 1

Season 2

References

 McNeil, Alex. Total Television  (1996). New York: Penguin Books 
 Brooks, Tim and Marsh, Earle, The Complete Directory to Prime Time Network and Cable TV Shows (1999). New York: Ballantine Books

External links
 

1958 American television series debuts
1958 American television series endings
Black-and-white American television shows
NBC original programming
Television series by Sony Pictures Television
Television series by Mark Goodson-Bill Todman Productions
1950s Western (genre) television series
English-language television shows
Television series about widowhood